Steinberg Station is located at the village of Steinberg in Nedre Eiker, Norway on the Sørlandet Line. The station is served by local trains between Kongsberg via Oslo to Eidsvoll operated by Vy. The station was opened in 1906 on what was then part of the Randsfjorden Line.

Railway stations in Buskerud
Railway stations on the Sørlandet Line
Railway stations on the Randsfjorden Line
Railway stations opened in 1906
Railway stations closed in 2012
1906 establishments in Norway
2012 disestablishments in Norway